The 2020–21 Super League Greece was the 85th season of the Super League Greece, the top Greek professional league for association football clubs, since its establishment in 1959. Olympiacos were the defending champions.

Teams
Fourteen teams will compete in the league – the top twelve teams from the previous season, one team of play-off winner and one team promoted from the Super League 2. The promoted team was PAS Giannina who has returned to the first tier after a one-season absence. They replaced Panionios (relegated after 23 seasons in the top flight).

Apollon Smyrnis were also promoted by virtue of winning the playoff round, which relegated Xanthi after 31 years.

Stadiums and locations

Note: Table lists in alphabetical order.

Personnel and kits

Managerial changes

Regular season

League table

Results

Positions by round

The table lists the positions of teams after each week of matches. To preserve chronological evolvements, any postponed matches are not included in the round at which they were originally scheduled, but added to the full round they were played immediately afterwards. For example, if a match is scheduled for round 13, but then postponed and played between rounds 16 and 17, it will be added to the standings for round 16.

Play-off round

The top six teams from Regular season will meet twice (10 matches per team) for places in 2021–22 UEFA Champions League and 2021–22 UEFA Europa Conference League as well as deciding the league champion.

Play-off round positions by round

Play-out round

Play-out round positions by round

Relegation play-offs

|+Summary

|}

Panetolikos won on away goals, therefore both teams stay in their respective leagues next season.

Season statistics

Top scorers

Top assists

Players' awards

NIVEA MEN Player of the Month

NIVEA MEN Best Goal

Annual awards
Annual awards were announced on 16 December 2021.

Team of the Year

References

External links
Official website 

Greece
1
A1 Ethniki
A1 Ethniki
2020-21